The tarka (Quechua, Aymara: tharqa) is an indigenous flute of the Andes. Usually made of wood, it has 6 finger holes, fipple on mouth end and free hole on distant end.

The tarka is a blockflute, like a recorder, but is comparatively shorter and quite angular in shape, requires greater breath, and has a darker, more penetrating sound.

The tarka has three variants: big, medium (tuned by fifth above) and small (tuned by octave above). Usually all three kinds of tarka are used together in a big ensemble, all playing the same melody on three voices at fixed intervals and accompanied by percussion instruments (tinya, wankar). This traditional genre is called tarqueada.

The tarka is a unique flute of the Andes made by artisans from the western region of Bolivia and Peru Sierra region. Artisans create a delightful sounding instrument which is also a beautifully intricate piece of art rich in detail and (sometimes) color. Versions are also marketed from Bolivia and other South American regions.

The flute is made of natural wood and features a whistle-type mouthpiece with a small air hole. The tarka sound and scale are different from any other Andean flute. It sounds very primitive, soft and mellow with a rasp in the low range.

Artisans still build this instrument that their ancestors used in tribal ceremonies to mimic bird sounds.

See also 
 Quena

Andean music
Bolivian musical instruments
Internal fipple flutes
Peruvian musical instruments